Noah Merl (born June 4, 1983 in Walnut Creek, California) is a psychotherapist for athletes and performers throughout the state of California. Noah is a former American professional soccer player, who played collegiate soccer at the University of California, Berkeley, and professionally for the Seattle Sounders. After retiring in 2008, he pursued a career in psychotherapy, attending graduate school at the University of Maryland, Baltimore. Noah then returned to California where he continues to work as a Licensed Clinical Social Worker while living with his wife and 3 children. In 2022 Noah started Athletic Acumen, his own private practice specializing in psychotherapy services specifically for elite athletes and performers.

Career

College and Amateur
Merl attended the University of California, Berkeley where he played college soccer from 2001 to 2004 and was captain his last 2 years.  During the 2004 collegiate off season, he spent the summer with Orange County Blue Star of the USL Premier Development League. During his final game with Cal, in the NCAA tournament at Southern Methodist University, Noah tore his PCL in his left knee, leading to a year-long recovery.

Professional
Merl was drafted in the third round (29th overall) of the 2005 MLS Supplemental Draft by the San Jose Earthquakes despite being injured, though he never played a first team game with the team, playing three games with their reserves before being released at the end of the season.

On April 10, 2006, he signed with Seattle Sounders of the USL First Division, and spent the next three seasons with the team, playing 21 games in his first season, and finishing his career there with 65 appearances. Noah represented the United States at the 2007 FIFA Beach Soccer World Cup in Rio de Janeiro, Brazil.

Following the demise of the USL1-1 Sounders at the end of 2008, Merl retired from professional soccer and pursued a career as a mental health therapist, currently licensed in California.

Honors

Seattle Sounders
USL First Division Championship (1): 2007
USL First Division Commissioner's Cup (1): 2007

References

External links
 Sounders player profile

1983 births
Living people
American soccer players
California Golden Bears men's soccer players
Orange County Blue Star players
San Jose Earthquakes players
Seattle Sounders (1994–2008) players
Washington Crossfire players
University of California, Berkeley alumni
USL League Two players
USL First Division players
San Jose Earthquakes draft picks
Soccer players from California
Association football midfielders